Ryan Folmar (born November 8, 1974) in an American baseball coach and former catcher. He is the current head baseball coach of the Oral Roberts Golden Eagles. He played college baseball at Oklahoma State from 1994 to 1997 for head coaches Gary Ward and Tom Holliday before playing professionally in the Colorado Rockies organization from 1997 to 1998.

Playing career
Folmar was drafted out of Chambersburg Area Senior High School in Chambersburg, Pennsylvania in the 46th round of the 1993 Major League Baseball Draft by the California Angels, but elected to attend Oklahoma State instead. After the 1994 season, he played collegiate summer baseball with the Cotuit Kettleers of the Cape Cod Baseball League. A four year starter with the Cowboys, he helped lead the team to the 1996 College World Series in his junior season.  After completing his collegiate career, he played two seasons in the Colorado Rockies organization.

Coaching career
He served as Director of Baseball Operations at Oklahoma State for five years, from 1999–2003 before accepting an assistant coach position at Oral Roberts.  He worked with infielders and as hitting coach for nine seasons and saw several players join the professional ranks.  He was named to his first head coaching position with the Golden Eagles in July 2012.

Head coaching record

See also
 List of current NCAA Division I baseball coaches

References

External links

Living people
1974 births
People from Hillsdale, Michigan
Asheville Tourists players
Oklahoma State Cowboys baseball coaches
Oklahoma State Cowboys baseball players
Cotuit Kettleers players
Oral Roberts Golden Eagles baseball coaches
Portland Rockies players
Arizona League Rockies players